The medal "Participant of the military operation in Syria" (Russian: Медаль «Участнику военной операции в Сирии») is an award of the Ministry of Defense of the Russian Federation. It was created by order of Sergei Shoigu on November 30, 2015 No. 732. The medal is awarded to servicemen and civilian personnel of the Armed Forces of the Russian Federation, who participate in or assist the Syrian or Russian forces in the struggle for the power of Syrian President Bashar al-Assad in the Civil War.

Description
The medal is made of gold-colored metal in a circular shape with a diameter of 32 mm, with a convex edge on both sides.

On the obverse of the medal: a relief monochrome image of military equipment: three fighter jets at the top, a missile ship at the bottom on the outline of the borders of Syria.

On the reverse of the medal, in the upper center, there is a relief monochrome image of the emblem of the Ministry of Defense of the Russian Federation, crowned with a double-headed eagle with outstretched wings. In the eagle's right paw is a sword, in the left is an oak wreath. On the eagle's chest is a triangular, downward-sloping shield with a shaft rising to the crown.

In the field of the shield - a rider striking a dragon with a spear, below it - a relief inscription in four lines "participant in the military operation in Syria", in a circle - a relief inscription: in the upper part - "Ministry of Defense", in the lower part - "Russian Federation ".

The medal is attached by means of an eye and a ring to a pentagonal pad covered with a silk moiré ribbon 24 mm wide. From the right edge of the ribbon, an orange stripe 10 mm wide, bordered on the right by a black stripe 2 mm wide, on the left - red, white and black stripes of equal size.

In March 2016, the Ministry of Defense of the Russian Federation ordered the production of 10,300 such medals.

History
Syrian President Bashar Assad took advantage of the formal treaty "On friendship and cooperation between the USSR and Syria" dated October 8, 1980 and on September 30, 2015, he turned to the Russian Federation for military assistance. The Federation Council of the Russian Federation agreed to help, limiting the offer to the use of the Russian Aerospace Forces to help the ground forces of Syria from the air, without conducting a ground operation.

On September 30, 2015, an air group of the Russian Federation, consisting of bombers and attack aircraft under the cover of fighter jets and helicopters, began to carry out strikes on civilian targets and Syrian rebels. Long-range aircraft and special forces were involved in the operation, some targets were fired with cruise missiles from the ships of the Caspian Flotilla and the Black Sea Fleet near Russian-occupied Crimea.

Awarding
On March 15, 2016, Russian Deputy Defense Minister Mykola Pankov and Syrian Army Chief of Staff Ali Abdullah Ayyoub awarded the military with Syrian and Russian awards at the Khmeimim Air Base.

On March 16, 2016, a group of Su-25 attack aircraft returned from Syria to the air base in Primorsko-Akhtarsk. The group did not include all the planes that participated in the war against the opposition. According to the Pentagon, 8-10 planes returned, the last ones abandoned at a base in Syria. According to Reuters data, out of 36 Russian planes, only 15 returned to the Russian Federation.

On March 17, 2016, a ceremony was held when three Su-24 bombers arrived back from Syria at the Shagol airbase near Chelyabinsk.

Awarding of civilians
Since the beginning of 2016, civilians (in particular artists, athletes, and politicians) who came to the Khmeimim Air Base to hold events for the military have also been widely awarded.

Notes

Orders, decorations, and medals of Russia
Military awards and decorations of Russia
Awards established in 2015
2015 establishments in Russia
Russian involvement in the Syrian civil war